Limnoposthia is a genus of worms belonging to the family Mecynostomidae.

Species:
 Limnoposthia polonica (Kolasa & Faubel, 1974)

References

Acoelomorphs